Brace Henry Arquiza (born December 12, 2000) is a Filipino actor, model, dancer and singer from Cavite, Philippines. Currently, he is a talent of ABS-CBN and is known for his role as Toffer in the primetime series Bagito. He was also a member of the boy band Gimme 5.

Career 
In 2011, he won the ASAP Supahdance contest.

In 2012, he played Aaron in the drama series Wansapanataym: Magic Shoes.

In 2013, he was launched as a part of the boygroup Gimme 5 together with his friends Joaquin Reyes, John Bermundo, Grae Fernandez and Nash Aguas. The group debuted in ASAP 18 where they performed the Wanted's "Glad You Came". Since then, the group regularly performed in ASAP. He also made appearances in Maalaala Mo Kaya for the episodes "Bimpo" and "Notebook".

In 2014, he starred in Wansapanataym's Perfecto alongside Nash Aguas, Alexa Ilacad, and the rest of the Gimme 5 members. In the same year, he starred in the TV series Bagito which was based on the Wattpad series of the same name by Noreen Capili alongside Nash Aguas, Alexa Ilacad, Ella Cruz, Angel Aquino and his fellow-members Joaquin Reyes, Grae Fernandez and John Bermundo.

Soon after, Gimme 5 released their self-titled debut album under Star Music which its carrier single, "Hatid Sundo".

In 2015, Gimme 5 won their first award as "Most Promising Recording/Performing Group" at the 46th GMMSF Box-Office Entertainment Awards.

In the same year, the "Teen Power: The Kabataan Pinoy Concert Party" led by Gimme 5 and joined by the PBB 737 Teen Housemates was held at the Aliw Theater in Pasay.

In 2017, the group came back to release their Sophomore album under Star Music, consisting of 5 new tracks with its carrier single, "Walang Dahilan".

In 2022, He joined the Eat Bulaga!'s segment Bida Next with Christian Dom Real.

In January 2023, Arquiza joined the Tanghalian Feel Good segment Kween of the Leader with Maja-Dayaw and Maja-Stig of ''Dancing Kween, aside from that he joined with Christian Dom Real with their cover version of Barry Manilow's I Write The Songs just in time for valentines day.

Filmography

Television

References

2000 births
Living people
ABS-CBN personalities
Star Magic personalities